Anthony J. "Tony" DeLuca is an American politician and former President pro tempore of the Delaware Senate. A Democrat, DeLuca lost the Democratic primary to Bryan Townsend in 2012.

References

External links
Project Vote Smart - Senator Anthony DeLuca (DE) profile
Follow the Money - Anthony J DeLuca
2006 2004 2002 campaign contributions

Democratic Party Delaware state senators
Living people
Year of birth missing (living people)